Sadiq Khan (born 1970) is the mayor of London.

Sadiq Khan or  similar names may refer to:

Sadeq Khan (fl. 1670S), Mughal faujdar
Sadeq Khan Zand (died 1781), Persian Shah
Sadek Khan (1933–2016), Bangladeshi writer
Janette Sadik-Khan (born 1961), commissioner of the New York City Department of Transportation from 2007 to 2013

See also
Siddiq Khan (disambiguation)